Anti-Tech Revolution: Why and How is a 2016 non-fiction book by Ted Kaczynski.

Book structure
There are four chapters and six appendices in the book:

Chapters:
The Development of a Society Can Never Be Subject to Rational Human Control
Why the Technological System Will Destroy Itself
How to Transform a Society: Errors to Avoid
Strategic Guidelines for an Anti-Tech Movement

Appendices:
In Support of Chapter One
In Support of Chapter Two
Stay on Target
The Long-Term Outcome of Geo-Engineering
Thurston's View of Stalin's Terror. State Terrorism in General.
The Teachings of Jesus Christ and Their Effect on Society

Synopsis
In the book, Kaczynski criticizes modern technological society (or "world-system" in Kaczynski's terminology) as a "self-propagating system" (which is a "self-propagating supersystem" consisting of various "self-propagating subsystems") that only seeks short-term benefits due to natural selection. He also argues that "the development of a society can never be subject to rational human control" (also the title of the first chapter) due to the unpredictable nature of the self-propagating system's evolution. As the self-propagating system continues to evolve, it will become ever more tightly coupled and highly complex, which are factors that greatly increase the risk of a catastrophic breakdown happening due to cascading failure.

Chapter 2 provides a detailed explanation of "why the technological system will destroy itself," and predicts that due to progressive collapse, modern globalized society will completely collapse and destroy all life on the planet if allowed to continue developing in the "business as usual" scenario. Government policies will not be able to stop these self-propagating systems, since the pressures of natural selection would cause them to circumvent such policies by any means possible.

Chapters 3 and 4 provide guidelines for an "anti-tech movement."

Publication history
In 2016, the first edition was published. A second edition was published by Fitch & Madison in 2020.

See also
 Collapsology
 Pentti Linkola
 Anarcho-primitivism
 Criticism of technology
 Green anarchism
 Neo-Luddism

Concepts
 Loose coupling
 Cascading failure
 Complex system#Features
 Holocene extinction
 Accelerating change

References

External links
First edition of the book on Archive.org

Societal collapse
Social systems
2016 non-fiction books
2016 in the environment
Technophobia
Complex systems theory